The following lists events that happened during 1980 in South Africa.

Incumbents
 State President: Marais Viljoen.
 Prime Minister: P.W. Botha.
 Chief Justice: Frans Lourens Herman Rumpff.

Events

January
 12 – The British Sports Council begins a fact-finding tour to investigate racial discrimination in South African sport.
 14 – The local community at Soekmekaar resists forced removal and damages the police station.
 25 – Four Umkhonto we Sizwe fighters kill two civilians and hold bank staff and customers hostage in Silverton.

March
 12 – The Nederduits Gereformeerde Kerk and its three sister churches announce that they have no objection to reconsideration of the Immorality- and Mixed Marriages Acts.
 12 – Nine people are sentenced to imprisonment for training as guerrillas and recruiting others.
 26 – A mine lift cage at the Vaal Reefs gold mine falls , killing 23.
 Two insurgents are killed by police in Bophuthatswana while another escapes.

April
 4 – Umkhonto we Sizwe attacks the Booysens Police Station in Johannesburg with grenades, rocket launchers and AK47s.
 21 – Over 60 coloured high schools, teacher training colleges and the University of the Western Cape begin class boycotts.
 29 – In Johannesburg hundreds of coloured school children are arrested in terms of the Riotous Assemblies Act, 1956.

May
 2 – Pink Floyd's Another Brick in the Wall is banned for fear that it may become a song of liberty by black pupils.
 6 – Thozamile Botha, a Port Elizabeth activist, breaks his banning order and escapes to Maseru, Lesotho.
 25 – The South African Defence Force attacks the town of Chifufua in Angola during Operation Sceptic.

June
 1 – Bombs explode at Sasol One and Two and Natref Eight at Sasolburg and Secunda, with no injuries and RM58 damage.
 4 – Patrick Makau, Umkhonto weSizwe member, and his child die in a bomb attack in Manzini, Swaziland.
 Expelled African National Congress official Tennyson Makiwane is shot dead.

August
 Special Branch policeman Detective-Sergeant T.G. Zondi is shot at in Sobantu Village.

September
 3 – Zimbabwe breaks diplomatic and consular relations with South Africa but maintains a commercial mission in Johannesburg.

October
 14 – The Soweto community calls for a stayaway to protest against rent increases.
 15 – A bomb damages a railway line in Dube, Soweto and Minister Piet Koornhof visits the scene.
 29 – Umkhonto we Sizwe insurgents throw grenades into the West Rand Administration Board buildings, injuring two.
 30 – A bomb explodes at the Transkei consul's residence in Port Elizabeth, with no injuries.

November
 21 – A terrorist is killed in Chiawelo and a child is injured by police in the process.

Births
 1 January – Megan McKenzie, model, voted South Africa's sexiest woman by readers of FHM in 2003, ranking behind only Halle Berry, sister of cricketer, Neil McKenzie.
 4 January – Justin Ontong, cricketer
 4 January – BJ Botha, rugby player
 10 February – Gabriel Temudzani, actor
 5 March – Brent Russell, rugby player
 20 March – Surprise Moriri, football player
 24 March – Conrad Jantjes, rugby player
 14 May – Joe Van Niekerk, rugby player
 19 May – Moeneeb Josephs, football player
 6 June – Mmusi Maimane, politician and former Democratic Alliance leader
 20 June – Kim Engelbrecht, actress best known for her portrayal of Lolly de Klerk on the SABC 3  soap opera; Isidingo
 3 July – Roland Schoeman, swimmer
 11 July – Jabu Mahlangu, football player
 27 August – CJ van der Linde, rugby player
 8 September – Mbulaeni Mulaudzi, olympics middle distance runner silver medalist (d. 2014)
 14 September – Hip Hop Pantsula, motswako rapper (d. 2018)
 16 September – Mbulelo Mabizela, football player
 24 September – Tanit Phoenix, model, actress, and makeup artist
 12 August – Karin Kortje, singer
 9 October – Thami Tsolekile, cricketer
 3 November – René Kalmer, long-distance runner
 9 November– Benson Mhlongo, football player
 11 November – Shashi Naidoo, TV presenter & actress
 15 November – Kabamba Floors, rugby player
 25 November – Aaron Mokoena, football player
 25 November – Alviro Petersen, cricketer

Deaths
 24 February – Clement Martyn Doke, linguist. (b. 1893)
 13 March – Lilian Ngoyi (Mma Ngoyi), dressmaker, activist and trade unionist. (b. 1911)
 9 May – Kate Molale, activist. (b. 1928)
 12 June – Billy Butlin, South African–born Canadian holiday camp entrepreneur. (b. 1899)
 7 July – Johannes Meintjes, artist and writer. (b. 1923)
 23 September – Jim Fouché, second State President. (b. 1898)

Railways

Locomotives
Three new Cape gauge locomotive types enter service on the South African Railways:
 August – The first of 101 Class 36-200 General Motors Electro-Motive Division SW1002 diesel-electric locomotives.
 The first of thirty  General Electric type U26C diesel-electric locomotives.
 The first of fifty 25 kV AC Class 7E1 electric locomotives on the Richards Bay coal line.

Sports

Athletics
 11 October – Thompson Magawana wins his first national title in the men's marathon, clocking 2:12:50 in Faure.

Motorsport
 1 March – The South African Grand Prix takes place at Kyalami.

Rugby
 10 May – The British and Irish Lions begin an 18-match tour of South Africa despite protests from anti-apartheid groups. The tourists lose three of the four Tests.

References

South Africa
Years in South Africa
History of South Africa